Collective agreement coverage or union representation refers to the proportion of people in a country population whose terms and conditions at work are made by collective bargaining, between an employer and a trade union, rather than by individual contracts. This is invariably higher than the union membership rate, because collective agreements almost always protect non-members in a unionised workplace. This means that, rather than individuals who have weaker bargaining power representing themselves in negotiations, people organise to represent each other together when negotiating for better pay and conditions in their workplace. The number of people who are covered by collective agreements is higher than the number of union members (or the "union density" rate), and in many cases substantially higher, because when trade unions make collective agreements they aim to cover everyone at work, even those who have not necessarily joined for membership.

Causes
The causes of higher or lower collective bargaining coverage are widely debated. Common causes are often identified as including the following:

whether a jurisdiction encourages sectoral collective bargaining (higher coverage) or enterprise bargaining (lower coverage)
whether collective agreements to create a closed shop or allow automatic enrollment in union membership are lawful
whether laws on collective bargaining and strikes are more or less favourable
whether the government, for instance through a Ministry or Department of Labour, actively promotes collective agreement coverage with a power to impose terms if employers refuse to bargain with the workforce
whether a country enables collective agreements to be extended by government regulations to all workers when the coverage rate reaches a majority in a sector, or similar level

By country

Sweden
Collective agreement coverage in Sweden was in 2017 90% of all employees (in the private sector 83%, in the public sector 100%). In 2017 union density was 69% (64% in the private sector, 79% in the public sector).

United States
In the United States in 2015 there were 14.8m union members, and 16.4m people covered by collective bargaining or union representation. Union membership was 7.4% in private sector, but 39% in the public sector. In the five largest states, California has 15.9% union membership, Texas 4.5%, Florida 6.8%, New York 24.7% (the highest in the country), and Illinois had 15.2%.

See also
European labour law
US labor law
UK labour law

Notes

References
Hamburger, 'The Extension of Collective Agreements to Cover Entire Trade and Industries' (1939) 40 International Labor Review 153
Methods of Collaboration between Public Authorities, Workers' Organizations, and Employers' Organizations (International Labour Conference, 1940) p. 112

Labour law
Labor relations